Knockacullion is a small townland in the north of County Monaghan in  Ireland. The local economy relies primarily on farming.

References

Townlands of County Monaghan